YAML (Yet Another Multicolumn Layout) is a cross-browser CSS framework. It allows web designers to create a low-barrier website with comparatively little effort. Integrations of the YAML layouts have been created for various content management systems. These include WordPress, LifeType, TYPO3, Joomla, xt: Commerce and Drupal.

As of YAML version 2.2, the framework is distributed under the Creative Commons Attribution 2.0 License (CC-BY 2.0). As an alternative for commercial use of the framework, there are two paid subscription models.

CMS templates on YAML basis 
There are a number of templates for the YAML framework, including for various content management systems and e-commerce systems such as:

 TYPO3
 Drupal
 Joomla
 DotNetNuke
 xt:Commerce
 ExpressionEngine
 MODX
 Papaya CMS
 Serendipity
 WordPress

See also
 Comparison of layout engines (Cascading Style Sheets)

References

Further reading

External links

CSS frameworks
Web design